This is the list of Native American superheroes, both as a superhero identity, and as fictional indigenous people of the Americas who are superheroes, from works of fiction (comic books, films, television shows, video games, etc.).

Arcana Studios
 Matthew Carver (Kagagi: The Raven) Anishinabe "Kagagi"

Azteca Productions 
 Plainsman (Daniel Brightfeather, part Cherokee, part Navajo, Team Tejas)

Blue Corn Comics 
 Rain Falling (Hopi / Pueblo, Peace Party)
 Snake Standing (Hopi / Pueblo, Peace Party)

Champion Comics 
 Johnny Fox (Seminole tribe of Florida)

Dark Horse Comics 
 Naayééʼneizghání (Navajo, vampire slayer, Tales of the Slayers / Buffyverse)

DC Comics 

 Apache Chief (member of Super Friends)
 Arak (Quontauka Native)
 Aztek (Aztecs)
 Black Condor (Navajo)
 Butcher (Lakota)
 Captain Fear (Carib)
 Captain Thunder (Mohegan)
 Chief Crazy Horse (Renegades)
 Chindi
 Chronos (Aztecs)
 Corona (Inuit, Aquaman's first love and mother of Koryak)
 Dawnstar (Puebloan, member of Legion of Super-Heroes)
 Eagle Free (Prez)
 Equinox (Canadian Cree, member of Justice League United)
 Flying Fox (Quontauka Indian, member of Young All-Stars)
 Green Arrow of Earth-D (Justice Alliance of America)
 Hawk (half-Apache, son of Tomahawk)
 Koryak (half-Inuit, Aquaman's son)
 Man-of-Bats (Sioux, member of Batmen of All Nations)
 Manitou Dawn (pre-Apache, member of JLA)
 Manitou Raven  (pre-Apache, member of JLA)
 Mirage (Indigenous, member of Team Titans)
 Night Eagle (ally of Superman)
 Owlwoman (Kiowa, member of Global Guardians)
 Pow Wow Smith (Sioux)
 Rain in the Face (Renegades)
 Raven (Navajo, Teen Titans: Earth One)
 Raven Red (Sioux, son and former sidekick of Man-of-Bats, member of Batmen of All Nations)
 Redbird (Batman sidekick, version of Robin in The Blue, The Grey, and The Bat)
 Russ Tenclouds (Metropolis S.C.U.)
 Seneca (Iroquois member of Cadre of the Immortal)
 Sky Alchesay (member of Aquaman's team The Others)
 Strong Bow (western hero of the 1800s)
 Super-Chief (Iroquois, Wolf Clan)
 Tall Tree (Renegades)
 Thomas Kalmaku (Inuit)
 Timber (half-Menominee, member of The Immortal Men)
 Wildstar (Puebloan, Dawnstar's ancestor, member of R.E.B.E.L.S.)
 Wise Owl (Shaman killed by Johnny Thunder in All-Star Western)
 Willpower (half-Apache, member of Primal Force)
 Wyynde
 Ya'Wara (Tapirapé, member of Aquaman's team The Others)

Vertigo
 Ghost Dancer (The Sandman)
 White Buffalo Woman (The Sandman)

Wildstorm
 Blackbird (Wetworks)
 Comanche (formerly of Stormwatch)
 Crossbones (Apache, Wetworks)
 Joe the Indian (half-Mexican, half-Navajo, Crimson)
 Pilgrim (Wetworks)
 Rainmaker (half-Apache, Gen¹³)
 Red Bird (Sioux, Black Ops)

Goldtooth Productions
Dallas Goldtooth (The Most Interesting Man on The Rez)
Whitney Rencountre II (The Most Interesting Man on The Rez: Rapid City Protectors)
Reggie 'Rocket' Taken Alive (The Most Interesting Man on The Rez: Spaulding Punks)
Cyril 'Chuckie' Archambault (The Most Interesting Man on The Rez: Northern Tribezmen)

Hexagon 
 Darkwing (Lakota)
 Ozark (Lakota)
 Plume Rouge 
 Rakar (Lakota)

Image Comics 
 Barbaric (Special Operations Taskforce, former member of Freak Force; wife is Ricochet)
 Broadarrow
 Ian Nottingham (a.k.a. Excalibur of Witchblade, of British and Native American descent)
 Kodiak (New Men)
 Nighteagle (Master Magus of the Age)
 Ripclaw (Apache, member of Cyberforce)
 Stalking Wolf (a.k.a. Shaman's Tears)

Marvel Comics 

 American Avenger (Pacqui)
 American Eagle (Navajo)
 Black Crow (Navajo)
 Centurious of the Firm (Amerind)
 Cusick (Tuscarora), Timespirits (Epic)
 Crusader-X, the Earth-2122 version of Captain Britain is a Native American of unspecified origin
 Danielle Moonstar (Cheyenne, member of New Mutants, X-Force)
 Doot (Wawenoc), Timespirits (Epic)
 Echo (a.k.a. Crazy Horse, Ronin) (half Cheyenne, half Latina, member of New Avengers)
 Elisa Maza police detective from the Gargoyles comic series, (half Hopi, half African American)
 Fire Eyes (Amerind, ally of Daimon Hellstrom Son of Satan)
 Forge (Cheyenne, member of X-Men & X-Factor)
 HighNote of the Young Gods (Part Colombian, part Native)
 Moonstalker (Inuit, member of Young Gods)
 Naze (Cheyenne, Forge's shaman teacher)
 Portal (member of same tribe as Puma)
 Pvt Jay Littlebear (of the Leatherneck Raiders)
 Puma (former enemy turned ally of Spider-Man, from an unnamed Arizona tribe)
 Red Warrior (Comanche)
 Red Wolf / Wildrun (Cheyenne, member of the Anachronauts)
 Red Wolf / Johnny Wakely (Cheyenne) 
 Red Wolf / Thomas Thunderhead (Cheyenne)
 Red Wolf / William_Talltrees (Cheyenne, member of the Rangers)
 Red Zeppelin (Unlimited Class Wrestling Federation)
 Redstone (Apache, member of Squadron Supreme, Earth S)
 Ringo Kid (half)
 Risque (Cuban Seminole, member of X-Corporation, deceased)
 Running Fish (half Apache, half Cibecue, Sunset Riders)
 Scalphunter, John Greycrow (Apache), mercenary, member of The Marauders and Krakoa's Hellions. 
 Shaman (Sarcee, member of Alpha Flight))
 Silver Fox (Native Canadian, ally of Wolverine)
 Sitting Bullseye (Band of the Bland)
 Snowbird (half Inuit god, member of Alpha Flight)
 Spirit/ Iron-Knife, Charlie (of G.I. Joe)
 Talisman (Sarcee, member of Alpha Flight)
 Talon (Derek Maza) leader of the Mutates from the Gargoyles comic series (half Hopi, half African American).
 Thunderbird (Apache, member of X-Men)
 T-bird, alternate Universe version of Thunderbird, (Apache, Exiles member)
 Tomorrow Hawk (a.k.a. Ceyote. of New Breed and Eternals)
 Venus (cloned from the DNA of Goliath and Elisa Maza, Gargoyles comic series)
 Warpath (Apache, member of New Mutants, X-Force, X-Corporation, & X-Men)
 Werehawk (Futurians)
 Witch Woman (former enemy turned ally of Ghost Rider)
 Wyatt Wingfoot (Keewazi, associate of Fantastic Four)
 Zachery Moonhunter (of the Avengers)

War Drums Studios / Mystic Comics 
 Earth (Navajo, Tribal Force)
 Gan (Apache, Tribal Force)
 Little Big Horn (Sioux, Tribal Force)
 Thunder Eagle (Lakota, Tribal Force)

Red Cloud Comics 
 Jake Red Cloud, Quechua (Red Cloud Comics)

Super Indian Comics
 Super Indian (Once a Rez Boy, Now a Super Hero) Comic book and radio series

Independents 

 Alma Grande, el Yaqui Justiciero (Mexican Yaqui, Publicaciones Herrerías, July 1961)
 Anthar (Gold Key Comics & Valiant Comics)
 Broadarrow (Valiant Comics)
 Centaur (1/8 Cherokee, F.R.E.E.Lancers)
 Cloud-Splitter (PS 238).
 Jerônimo (from Jerônimo, o Herói do Sertão, RGE, 1957)
 Johnny Cougar (Seminole)  (Tiger Fleetway, May 6, 1967)
 John Redfeather (from Spirit of the Wolf) (Wild Wolf Studio)
 Haokah the Thunder Being (Spirit of the Wolf) (Wild Wolf Studio)
 Coyote the Trickster (Spirit of the Wolf)  (Wild Wolf Studio)
 Koda the Warrior (Lakota)
 Longhunter (Valiant Comics)
 Nighthawk (Navajo, F.R.E.E.Lancers)
 Scout (Apache, Eclipse Comics)
 Scratchbuilt (Half Miskito, Half Central American, F.R.E.E.Lancers)
 Stallion Canuck (Native Canadian, Created by Lou Douzepis, King Led Comics)
 Supermaya (Mayan, Mexican comic)
 Tall Tree (Freedom Fighters, Valiant Comics)
 White Buffalo Warriors (Valiant Comics)
 Wilde Knight
 Charles Smith (Red Dead Redemption)
 Jenny Everywhere (Jenny Everywhere)

Newspapers 
 Captain Chinook (from a Canadian newspaper, created by Jean Claude St. Aubin)
 MuttonMan, a comic in the Navajo Times, created by Navajo comedian Vincent Craig
 Patoruzú (Tehuelche, Argentine comic character created in 1928 by Dante Quinterno)

Radio 
 Straight Arrow (1948-1950, NABISCO promotional character) 
 Super Shamou (Inuk, Inuit Broadcasting Corporation, 1980s)
 Tonto (a.k.a. Toro, Adventures of the Lone Ranger)
 Super Indian

Television 

 Apache Chief (Apache, Super Friends)
 BraveStarr (BraveStarr Cartoon Series)
 Catwoman played by Eartha Kitt in the 1966 Batman TV series
 Delilah from the Gargoyles animated series (cloned from Elisa Maza and Demona's DNA, of multiractial heritage)
 Elisa Maza police detective from the Gargoyles TV series, (half Hopi, half African American)
 Geronimo of Kinnikuman series voiced by Kaneto Shiozawa (in Kinnikuman) and Eric Stuart (In Ultimate Muscle).
 Jade (Guatemala Clan, Gargoyles TV series)
 Kagagi: The Raven (Anishinabe) 
 Long Shadow of Justice League Unlimited, voiced by Gregg Rainwater
 Nightwolf of Mortal Kombat: Defenders of the Realm voiced by Tod Thawley
 Obsidiana (Guatemala Clan, Gargoyles TV series)
 Super Shamou (Inuk, Inuit Broadcasting Corporation, 1980s)
 Talon (Derek Maza) leader of the Mutates from the Gargoyles animated series (half Hopi, half African American)
 Turquesa (Guatemala Clan, Gargoyles TV series)
 Tye Longshadow (Apache) of Young Justice, voiced by Gregg Rainwater
 Zafiro (Guatemala Clan, Gargoyles TV series)
 Tommy Oliver of the Power Rangers series

Video games 
 Chief Thunder of Killer Instinct
 Michelle Chang of Tekken (half Native American, half Chinese)
 Julia Chang of Tekken (half Native American, half Chinese)
 Nightwolf of Mortal Kombat
 [TIW] Madrey of Planetside 2
 Domasi "Thommy" Tawodi of Prey (Cherokee)
 Tal' Set of Turok (series)
 Red Harlow of Red Dead Revolver (half Native American)
 Ratonhnhaké:ton, aka Connor of Assassin's Creed III (half Mohawk, half British)
 Delsin Rowe of Infamous: Second Son
 T. Hawk (fictional character in the Street Fighter series)

Film 
 Jake Red Cloud of Red Cloud: Deliverance (played by Alex Kruz)
 Gail of Old Town in the Sin City movie, portrayed by Rosario Dawson
 Nightwolf of Mortal Kombat: Annihilation (played by Litefoot)
 Vadinho (Aztec, mentor of Pumaman, L' Uomo puma / Pumaman, ADR Films 1980)
Tonto of The Lone Ranger (played by Johnny Depp)

See also
 List of fictional Native Americans

References

External links
 International Hero: superheroes from around the world
 Jorge's Supers Lists
 Marvel Universe Appendix
 The Religious Affiliation of Comic Book Characters
 DCU Guide
 

Native
 
Native American-related lists